SCBI may refer to:

Smithsonian Conservation Biology Institute
State Convention of Baptists in Indiana
Sylloge of Coins of the British Isles
the ICAO airport code for Pampa Guanaco Airport